Hoylake Urban District was an urban district in Cheshire, England. It was formerly known as West Kirby and Hoylake Urban District (1894–97), then Hoylake and West Kirby Urban District (1897–1933). It was the local authority for the towns of Hoylake and West Kirby, in the north-west of the Wirral Peninsula.

Several civil parishes of the disbanded Wirral Rural District were added in 1933. These were: Caldy, Frankby, Grange, Greasby and part of Saughall Massie.

In 1898 a new town hall and council offices opened on Market Street, Hoylake. After the abolition of the local authority, the building was retained for community use. As of  it is being redeveloped as part of The Beacon project, consisting of apartments, retail units, an arts centre and cinema.

The coat of arms of Hoylake were granted on 1 November 1960 and included two golf clubs on the shield, representing the Royal Liverpool Golf Club.

On 1 April 1974, under the Local Government Act 1972, the urban district was abolished and its area absorbed into the Metropolitan Borough of Wirral of the metropolitan county of Merseyside.

References

History of Cheshire
History of Merseyside
Districts of England abolished by the Local Government Act 1972
Local government in the Metropolitan Borough of Wirral
Former districts of Cheshire
Urban districts of England